The vice chair of the Board of Governors of the Federal Reserve System is the second-highest officer of the Federal Reserve, after the chair of the Federal Reserve. In the absence of the chair, the vice chair presides over the meetings Board of Governors of the Federal Reserve System.

The vice chair and the vice chair for supervision each serve a four-year term after being nominated by the president of the United States and confirmed by the United States Senate, and they serve concurrently as members of the Board of Governors. Both vice chairs may serve multiple terms, pending a new nomination and confirmation at the end of each term, with Ronald Ransom as the longest serving vice chair from 1936 to 1947. They cannot be dismissed by the president before the end of their term.

The position of vice chair was most recently held by Lael Brainard who was sworn in on May 23, 2022 and resigned on February 18, 2023. The position of vice chair for supervision is currently held by Michael Barr who was sworn in on July 19, 2022.

Appointment process 
As stipulated by the Banking Act of 1935, the president may designated to serve as Vice Chairman of the Board for four-year terms with the advice and consent of the Senate, from among the sitting governors. The Senate Committee responsible for vetting a Federal Reserve vice chair and vice chair for supervision nominees is the Senate Committee on Banking.

Duties of the Fed vice сhairs  
The vice chair of the Board shall serve in the absence of the chair as leader of the Federal Reserve system until chair's replacement was installed by the Senate.

By law, the vice chair, as part of the Board, make a full report of its operations to the speaker of the House, on progress towards the Fed's responsibilities and monetary policy objectives, which are "maximum employment, stable prices, and moderate long-term interest rates."

The duties of the vice chair for supervision would include developing policy recommendations regarding supervision and regulation for the Board. The vice chairman of supervision will report to Congress semiannually on the efforts of the board with respect to the conduct of supervision and regulation.

By law, the vice chair for supervision shall appear before the Senate Committee on Banking, Housing, and Urban Affairs and the House Committee on Financial Services of the House of Representatives and at semi-annual hearings regarding the efforts, activities, objectives, and plans of the Board with respect to the conduct of supervision and regulation of depository institution holding companies and other financial firms supervised by the Board.

Conflict of interest law 
The law applicable to the chair, vice chairs and all other members of the board provides (in part):

Salary 
The Vice Chair of the Federal Reserve and the Vice Chair for Supervision are Level II positions in the Executive Schedule, thus earning the salary prescribed for that level (US$203,700, as of January 2023).

List of Fed vice chairs 
The following is a list of past and present vice chairs of the Board of Governors of the Federal Reserve System. A vice chair serves for a four-year term after appointment, but may be reappointed for several consecutive four-year terms. Since the Federal Reserve was established in 1914, the following people have served as vice chair.

List of Fed vice chairs for supervision
The Dodd–Frank Wall Street Reform and Consumer Protection Act, which came into force on July 21, 2010, required the President to designate, by and with the advice and consent of the Senate, a new "Vice Chairman for Supervision," who "shall develop policy recommendations for the Board regarding supervision and regulation of depository institution holding companies and other financial firms supervised by the Board and shall oversee the supervision and regulation of such firms." Since the Dodd–Frank Act was enacted in 2010, the following people have served as vice chair for supervision.

See also

 History of central banking in the United States

Notes

References

Further reading
 
 
 Beckhart, Benjamin Haggott. 1972. Federal Reserve System. [New York]: American Institute of Banking.
 Shull, Bernard. 2005. The fourth branch: the Federal Reserve's unlikely rise to power and influence. Westport, Conn.: Praeger.

External links
 
 Nomination hearings, conducted in the Senate, for Chairs and Members of the Board of Governors of the Federal Reserve System

 
United States